Arnold Taylor (15 July 1945 – 22 November 1981) was a South African boxer who held the Lineal and WBA bantamweight championships in 1973.

Background
Taylor lived during the apartheid period; Born to Muriel and Joe Taylor on 15 July 1945.  White South African.  Taylor was a qualified confectioner, he used to work at a local bakery in Johannesburg during the day before training at night.

Pro career
Arnold Taylor made his professional boxing debut on 20 May 1967, against Ray Buttle, against whom he drew after six rounds in Transvaal. His first three fights were against Buttle; he won the Transvaal Bantamweight title with a ninth-round knockout of Buttle in his second fight, held on 30 June of the same year, at Johannesburg. On 11 December, he outpointed Buttle over eight rounds in a non-title bout, also at Johannesburg.

On 19 February 1968, he won the South African Bantamweight title; in only his fourth fight, beating Andries Steyn over twelve rounds by decision. After two non-title wins, he lost the title, and suffered his first career defeat, when he was knocked out in the first round by Dennis Adams on 1 July of the same year.

After that defeat, he had eight wins in a row, including three against Herby Clark (one by knockout, one by disqualification in six rounds and one by decision), and one each over Edward Mbongwa (on 7 September 1968, in what was his first fight abroad, fought in Swaziland) and one in Lesotho over Anthony Morodi. His third win over Clark, a twelve-round decision on 12 May 1969, actually gave him the South African Lightweight division, 15 pounds (about 1.1 stone) over his natural fighting weight.

Next was a rematch with Adams. Taylor lost weight to fight Adams for the South African Featherweight title, and he avenged his first defeat, conquering his third regional title along the way, by knocking Adams out in round eight, exactly twelve days after conquering the Lightweight title. He decided to vacate the Featherweight title and concentrate on defending his Lightweight title, but he lost that title on his first defense, when rematched with Steyn, on 4 July 1969, by a knockout in round eight also.

Two wins and one defeat later, he fought Ray Buttle's brother, Mike Buttle, in a rematch for the South African Bantamweight title, on 6 December; he had beaten Mike Buttle by a fifth-round knockout three weeks before. The rematch lasted one more round, as Taylor regained the title with a sixth-round knockout.

Taylor began the 1970s with an upgrade in opposition quality, when he fought fellow world Bantamweight champion Johnny Famechon, of Australia, on 11 April 1970, at Johannesburg. In his first fight against a former or future world champion, Taylot lost a ten-round decision. In his next fight, he faced Ray Buttle once again, this time winning again with a ninth-round knockout, on 15 August, to regain the South African Featherweight title. This began a streak of nineteen wins in a row, including five in Australia (where he lived for the first half of 1971), and one in Zimbabwe. After he had reached sixteen wins in a row, he was given his first world title shot.

On 3 November 1973, Taylor met the Lineal and WBA World Bantamweight champion, Mexico's Romeo Anaya, in a match refereed by Stanley Christodoulou. The fight is considered by many one of boxing's classic fights. One South African sportswriter called it "the bloodiest fight in South African boxing history". Taylor suffered a cut and was knocked down once in round five and three times in round eight (the WBA has since adopted a rule where a fighter is automatically declared a knockout loser if he or she is knocked down three times in the same round). Nevertheless, Taylor also cut the champion, and, in round fourteen, he connected with a right hand to Anaya's jaw, sending him to the floor. Feeling that this was his moment to become a world champion, Taylor screamed to his trainers: "He's gone!" from a neutral corner. It took Anaya two minutes to get up, and Taylor won the World Bantamweight crown.

After two non-title wins (including one over future Carlos Zarate challenger Paul Ferreri), Taylor defended his title for the only time, against Soo-Hwan Hong, on 3 July 1974, also at Durban. In what is also considered by many to be another boxing classic, Taylor was once again dropped four times. He was dropped three times early in the fight, and he staged a rally from rounds ten to fifteen, constantly pinning the challenger against the ring's corners and ropes, but he was dropped for a fourth time in round fourteen, and ended up losing the title by a fifteen-round unanimous decision.

The rest of his career was mostly undistinguished. He won four fights in a row, but, after losing two fights back to back, he decided to retire. Two fights that stand out among his last six fights were a rematch with Anaya, whom he beat again, by knockout in eight rounds at Johannesburg on 27 June 1975, and his last fight, when he was knocked out in eight rounds by Vernon Sollas, on 24 November 1976. His last two fights took place in Norway and England, respectively.

Death
Taylor died on 22 November 1981. While driving a motorcycle belonging to his eldest daughter Charmaine, he was involved in an accident in which he was knocked over and he died at the scene of the accident.

Professional boxing record

See also
List of bantamweight boxing champions
List of WBA world champions

References

External links

Arnold Taylor - CBZ Profile

1945 births
1981 deaths
Boxers from Johannesburg
South African people of British descent
Bantamweight boxers
World boxing champions
World bantamweight boxing champions
World Boxing Association champions
South African male boxers
Motorcycle road incident deaths